Strand is a village in Sortland Municipality in Nordland county, Norway. The village is located on the island of Hinnøya at the eastern end of the Sortland Bridge which crosses the Sortlandsundet strait and connects to the town of Sortland on Langøya island.

References

Sortland
Villages in Nordland
Populated places of Arctic Norway